The 1964–65 NBA season was the Lakers' 17th season in the NBA and fifth season in Los Angeles.

The team reached the NBA Finals, only to fall against the Boston Celtics in five games.

Roster

Regular season

Standings

x – clinched playoff spot

Record vs. opponents

Game log

Playoffs

|- align="center" bgcolor="#ccffcc"
| 1
| April 3
| Baltimore
| W 121–115
| Jerry West (49)
| LeRoy Ellis (15)
| Jerry West (8)
| Los Angeles Memorial Sports Arena14,579
| 1–0
|- align="center" bgcolor="#ccffcc"
| 2
| April 5
| Baltimore
| W 118–115
| Jerry West (52)
| Gene Wiley (12)
| Jerry West (9)
| Los Angeles Memorial Sports Arena10,594
| 2–0
|- align="center" bgcolor="#ffcccc"
| 3
| April 7
| @ Baltimore
| L 115–122
| Jerry West (44)
| Gene Wiley (13)
| Jerry West (4)
| Baltimore Civic Center7,247
| 2–1
|- align="center" bgcolor="#ffcccc"
| 4
| April 9
| @ Baltimore
| L 112–114
| Jerry West (48)
| Rudy LaRusso (14)
| Jerry West (5)
| Baltimore Civic Center10,642
| 2–2
|- align="center" bgcolor="#ccffcc"
| 5
| April 11
| Baltimore
| W 120–112
| Jerry West (43)
| LeRoy Ellis (18)
| Jerry West (7)
| Los Angeles Memorial Sports Arena15,013
| 3–2
|- align="center" bgcolor="#ccffcc"
| 6
| April 13
| @ Baltimore
| W 117–115
| Jerry West (42)
| LeRoy Ellis (10)
| Jerry West (8)
| Baltimore Civic Center8,590
| 4–2
|-

|- align="center" bgcolor="#ffcccc"
| 1
| April 18
| @ Boston
| L 110–142
| Jerry West (26)
| Gene Wiley (14)
| Walt Hazzard (5)
| Boston Garden13,909
| 0–1
|- align="center" bgcolor="#ffcccc"
| 2
| April 19
| @ Boston
| L 123–129
| Jerry West (45)
| Gene Wiley (15)
| Jerry West (5)
| Boston Garden13,909
| 0–2
|- align="center" bgcolor="#ccffcc"
| 3
| April 21
| Boston
| W 126–105
| Jerry West (43)
| Gene Wiley (28)
| Jerry West (7)
| Los Angeles Memorial Sports Arena14,243
| 1–2
|- align="center" bgcolor="#ffcccc"
| 4
| April 23
| Boston
| L 99–112
| LeRoy Ellis (24)
| Gene Wiley (19)
| Wiley, Hazzard (5)
| Los Angeles Memorial Sports Arena15,217
| 1–3
|- align="center" bgcolor="#ffcccc"
| 5
| April 25
| @ Boston
| L 96–129
| Jerry West (33)
| Gene Wiley (13)
| Walt Hazzard (10)
| Boston Garden13,909
| 1–4
|-–

Awards and records
Elgin Baylor, All-NBA First Team
Jerry West, All-NBA First Team
Elgin Baylor, NBA All-Star Game
Jerry West, NBA All-Star Game

References

Los Angeles Lakers seasons
Los Angeles Lakers
Los Angle
Los Angle